Glenwood is an unincorporated community and Ohio river town in Mason County, in the U.S. state of West Virginia. It is notable for the Haunted Plumley Mansion. The town can be found along West Virginia Route 2 south of Ashton.

The town's only gas station and premier stop is Trippett's Dandi-Mart, owned and operated Joseph Melton (Milt) Trippett, which has been in business for over 50 years.

A notable resident is the Catfish Man of the Woods.

The community is part of the Point Pleasant, WV–OH Micropolitan Statistical Area.

References

External links
Mason County History Sources (WV Division of Culture & History)

Unincorporated communities in West Virginia
Unincorporated communities in Mason County, West Virginia
Point Pleasant micropolitan area
West Virginia populated places on the Ohio River